See the Sea is the fourth studio album by the South Korean singer Bada.  It was released on August 6, 2009 and peaked on the MNet album chart at no. 9.

Track listing

References

2009 albums
Bada (singer) albums